Lensk is the name of several inhabited localities in Russia.

Modern localities
Urban localities
Lensk, a town in Lensky District of the Sakha Republic

Rural localities
Lensk, Krasnoyarsk Krai, a village in Subbotinsky Selsoviet of Shushensky District in Krasnoyarsk Krai
Lensk, Perm Krai, a selo in Kungursky District of Perm Krai

Alternative names
Lensk, alternative name of Lenskoye, a selo in Mosalsky District of Kaluga Oblast

See also
Lensky (disambiguation)